Apoptosis-related protein 3 is a protein that in humans is encoded by the ATRAID gene.

This gene is thought to be involved in apoptosis, and may also be involved in hematopoietic development and differentiation. Two alternatively spliced transcript variants encoding different isoforms have been found for this gene.

References

External links

Further reading